Sarah McLauchlan (born 6 April 1973) is a New Zealand former cricketer who played as a right-arm medium bowler. She appeared in 4 Test matches and 29 One Day Internationals for New Zealand between 1992 and 1997. Her final WODI appearance was in the final of the 1997 Women's Cricket World Cup. She played domestic cricket for Canterbury and Auckland.

References

External links

1973 births
Living people
Cricketers from Christchurch
New Zealand women cricketers
New Zealand women Test cricketers
New Zealand women One Day International cricketers
Canterbury Magicians cricketers
Auckland Hearts cricketers